Alice Elisabeth Weidel (born 6 February 1979) is a German politician and has been the leader of the Alternative for Germany (AfD) in the Bundestag since October 2017. She has been a member of the Bundestag (MdB) since the 2017 federal election during which she was the AfD's lead candidate together with Alexander Gauland. Since November 2019, she has been the deputy federal spokeswoman for her party and, since February 2020, chairwoman of the AfD state association in Baden-Württemberg.

Early life and career
Weidel was born in Gütersloh and grew up in Versmold, where she graduated from a Christliches Jugenddorfwerk Deutschlands (CJD) gymnasium in 1998. She studied economics and business administration at the University of Bayreuth and graduated as one of the best in the year in 2004. After receiving her undergraduate university degree, Weidel went to work for Goldman Sachs from July 2005 to June 2006 as an analyst in asset management in Frankfurt. In the late 2000s, she worked at the Bank of China, living six years in China. She speaks Mandarin. Subsequently, she wrote a doctoral thesis with the health economist Peter Oberender at the Faculty of Law and Economics in Bayreuth on the future of the Chinese pension system. In 2011, she received her doctorate summa cum laude and became a doctor of philosophy in international development. Her doctorate was supported by the Konrad Adenauer Foundation.

From March 2011 to May 2013, she worked at Allianz Global Investors in Frankfurt. Since 2014, she has worked as a freelance business consultant. In 2015, she worked for Rocket Internet and Foodora. Weidel is a member of the Friedrich A. von Hayek Society.

Politics

Alternative for Germany
Weidel joined the Alternative for Germany (AfD) in October 2013. According to Weidel, she was first attracted to the party due to her opposition to the Euro. She was elected to the federal executive committee of the AfD in June 2015. In April 2017 she was elected co-Lead Candidate of the party. She is the first lesbian to serve as a lead candidate of her party. She has been identified by the media as belonging to the more moderate conservative Alternative Mitte faction within the AfD.

Political positions

Religion

At the end of 2017, Weidel accused the Catholic Church and the Protestant Evangelical Church of Germany of "playing the same inglorious role that they played in the Third Reich", accusing both churches of being "thoroughly politicized" and stating that AfD is "the only Christian party that still exists" in Germany. Such statements were dismissed by the Catholic German Bishops' Conference and the Evangelical Church as "polemics" and "derailment".

Immigration
Weidel has criticized the immigration policies of Angela Merkel, stating that "the country will be destroyed through this immigration policy. Donald Trump said that Merkel is insane and I absolutely agree with that. It is a completely nonsensical form of politics that is being followed here." She has called for the German government to invest in "special economic zones" in the Middle East to encourage educated and skilled persons to remain in their home countries and avoid the possibility of brain drain, but also says she supports a "Canadian-style system" which would privilege skilled, over unskilled, immigrants.

European Union
Weidel supports continued German membership in the European Union; however, she has called for economically weak states, such as Greece, to leave. And, though supporting the EU, she also believes Germany should withdraw from the Euro single currency.

LGBT issues
Weidel has stated her opposition to discussion of sexuality prior to puberty saying that "I don't want anyone with their gender idiocy or their early sexualisation classes coming near my children".

She has also expressed her opposition to legalization of same-sex marriage, stating that she supports protection of the "traditional family" while also supporting "other lifestyles". She has said she supports civil partnership for gay and lesbian couples, noting she is a lesbian herself and in a civil partnership with another woman.

Economic issues
She vigorously defends economic liberalism and declares former UK Prime Minister Margaret Thatcher to be her role model.

She wants tax cuts, the abolition of inheritance tax and opposes the minimum wage.

Environment

She expressed her doubts about global warming.

Controversies

TV show "political correctness" incident 
In April 2017, Weidel railed against political correctness, claiming that it belonged in the "dustbin of history". In response, on 27 April, TV presenter Christian Ehring of the satire program extra 3 addressed this, saying "That's right! Let's put an end to political correctness. The Nazi slut is right. Was this incorrect enough? I hope so!" Weidel sued the channel seeking to forbid re-airing of the program, and on 17 May the Hamburg District Court ruled against her, stating that a public figure must tolerate exaggerated criticism.  Weidel disagreed with the decision and promised to bring it to the Oberlandesgericht (Higher Regional Court). As of September 2017, no further action had taken place.

Illegal immigration incident
A September 2017 report by Die Zeit claimed that Weidel had illegally hired a Syrian refugee to do housework at her home in Switzerland. The report also alleged that the asylum seeker did not have a written work contract, nor were there invoices for her work. Weidel responded in a tweet that the Die Zeit report was "fake news" and "false" and Weidel's lawyer stated that Weidel had a Syrian stay at her home as a guest but not as a worker.

Personal life
Weidel is in a relationship with a woman who lives in Einsiedeln, Switzerland and is originally from Sri Lanka; she works as a film producer. Weidel primarily lives in Berlin, but lives part-time in Einsiedeln. They are in a civil union and have two adopted children.

Selected publications 
 Das Rentensystem der Volksrepublik China. Reformoptionen aus ordnungstheoretischer Sicht zur Erhöhung der Risikoresistenz (= Schriften zur Nationalökonomie. Band 60). Verlag P.C.O., Bayreuth 2011, .

References

External links 

1979 births
Living people
People from Gütersloh
Members of the Bundestag for Baden-Württemberg
Leaders of political parties in Germany
21st-century German women politicians
LGBT Christians
LGBT conservatism
LGBT members of the Bundestag
Lesbian politicians
University of Bayreuth alumni
German LGBT politicians
Members of the Bundestag 2017–2021
Members of the Bundestag for the Alternative for Germany
Female members of the Bundestag
German Christians
Critics of multiculturalism
Members of the Bundestag 2021–2025
Women opposition leaders
21st-century German LGBT people